The Burning of Colón, or the Panama Incident, was a major event of the Colombian Civil War in 1885. Panamanian rebels loyal to Pedro Prestan destroyed the city by committing arson before retreating after a battle with federal Colombian troops. The episode also included a landing by United States Navy sailors and marines from two warships after the rebels seized American citizens.

Incident
In the late 1800s Colombia's political situation was in turmoil as revolution and riots plagued the country. In 1885 another revolution began which spilled into the Isthmus of Panama. On or about March 16 the rebel leader Pedro Prestan occupied the small port of Colón on the Gulf Coast where he was waiting for a shipment of weapons by the American merchant ship Colon of the Pacific Mail Steamship Company. On March 26, Captain John M. Dow, representing the Pacific Mail Steamship Company in Colon, received a letter from the Panamanian sub-Secretary of State informing him that the offloading of any weapons intended for rebels was strictly prohibited. On the following day, Captain Dow received another letter from Secretary General Gomina which advised that he had assumed the position of commander-in-chief of civil and military affairs and should any of the weapons be removed from the Colon then the agent responsible for their delivery might attempt  to seek asylum from the American or French naval forces present. Dow then informed the United States consul Mr. Wright who relayed orders from the consul-general Mr. Adamson not to allow any weapons to be offloaded without the permission of the consulate or Captain Theodore Kane of the steamer USS Galena, which happened to be in port at the time. So on March 29, when the Colon arrived at Colon with fifty-two packages marked "M", Captain Dow assumed command and ordered that nothing be taken off the ship. This angered Pedro Prestan when he came to pick up his delivery and Dow and three others were then taken under arrest by militiamen, one of the captives was a United States Navy lieutenant named Judd.

When Captain Kane learned of the arrests, negotiations began between the two parties. Prestan wanted his guns and the Kane wanted the American citizens to be released but the captain could not use force as it meant risking the lives of the prisoners. Rebel forces included at least 100 men, around twenty of whom accompanied Prestan at all times and fortified a small position within the city streets. The remaining men were based outside of town at Monkey Hill. The rebels had an old cannon as well and threatened to open fire on the Galena if she came in towards the shore. Prestan also declared that if he was forced to retreat, he would destroy the city with dynamite. For several hours, until the next day, the negotiations proceeded and the Americans refused to give Prestan the cargo of weapons. Meanwhile, Captain Dow and the other prisoners were taken to the Panamanian base to be executed by a firing squad. Soon after Mr. Right ordered that the weapons be given up as it was the only means of releasing the hostages. Unknowingly, Captain Kane was distracting the rebels while the Colombian Army approached Colon. Eventually Prestan became alarmed and supposedly ordered his men to begin burning the city but it was later determined that he never gave such order; each party blamed the other for starting the fire, for which Prestán was hanged and later absolved by "resolución No. 101-30-48 de 24 de Septiembre"). Shortly thereafter the Colombians launched their attack. For a few hours the Panamanians held their position while the city burned around them until they were finally routed during the last Colombian charge. A detachment of about 100 marines and sailors from the Galena then landed at the request of the Colombian government and 600 more men and two cannons from the USS Tennessee arrived within the next few days. Admiral James Edward Jouett assumed command of American forces which was tasked with protecting American property. This was hard because the fire quickly spread throughout Colon, causing great damage. Several of the destroyed buildings were American or European owned and damages amounted to the millions though compensation was never paid.

Colon burned for days and the American garrison withdrew without doing much to save the city. United States citizens were also evacuated along with other foreign nationals. The American government responded to the incident by sending men to occupy both Colon, for a second time, and the city of Panama. There were no American casualties but between the Panamanians and the Colombians, eighteen people were killed and many more were wounded in action or hurt by the fire.

References

History of United States expansionism
History of Panama
United States Navy in the 19th century
History of Colombia
Colombia–United States relations
Naval operations and battles
Colon
Colón
March 1885 events
April 1885 events